El Uweilia is a village in the Jebel Akhdar mountains foothills region in Libya.

During the Italian occupation it was known Maddalena after the Italian aviator .

Photo gallery

References

Populated places in Marj District
Cyrenaica